Bramwell Fletcher (20 February 1904 – 22 June 1988) was an English stage, film, and television actor.

Career
Fletcher appeared on the stage in 1927 and made his Broadway debut in 1929. Hollywood and sound films soon beckoned. He made his first film in 1928, S.O.S. Fletcher co-starred in Warner Brothers' 1931 film Svengali with actor John Barrymore, whose daughter Diana would marry Fletcher a decade later. He had a brief but notable appearance in The Mummy (1932) as the assistant gone mad. In 1943, he abandoned films for the theatre and television. He wrote and acted in the critically successful 1965 play The Bernard Shaw Story.

Personal life
His first two wives were actresses. He was married to Helen Chandler from 1935 to 1940 and Diana Barrymore from 1942 to 1946. Both marriages ended in divorce. In 1950 he married Susan Robinson and had 3 children. In 1970 he married Lael Tucker Wertenbaker living with her in Nelson, New Hampshire, moving to Keene in 1985. He remained with her until his death in 1988.

Complete filmography

 Chick (1928) - Chick Beane
 S.O.S. (1928) - Herriott
 To What Red Hell (1929) - Jim Nolan
 So This Is London (1930) - Alfred Honeycutt
 Raffles (1930) - Bunny
 The Millionaire (1931) - Carter Andrews
 Svengali (1931) - Billee
 Men of the Sky (1931) - Eric
 Daughter of the Dragon (1931) - Ronald Petrie
 Once a Lady (1931) - Allen Corinth
The Silent Witness (1932) - Anthony Howard
 A Bill of Divorcement (1932) - Gareth (uncredited)
 The Face on the Barroom Floor (1932) - Bill Bronson
 The Mummy (1932) - Ralph Norton
 The Monkey's Paw (1933) - Herbert White
 Only Yesterday (1933) - Scott Hughes
 The Right to Romance (1933) - Man with the Maceys
 Nana (1934) - Minor Role (uncredited)
 The Scarlet Pimpernel (1934) - The Priest
 Line Engaged (1935) - David Morland
 The Undying Monster (1942) - Dr. Jeff Colbert
 White Cargo (1942) - Wilbur Ashley
 Random Harvest (1942) - Harrison
 Immortal Sergeant (1943) - Symes
 Bread of Freedom (1952, TV movie)
 Drama into Opera: Oedipus Rex (1961, TV movie)

References

External links

Obituary in The New York Times
Bramwell Fletcher papers, 1934-1981, held by the Billy Rose Theatre Division, New York Public Library for the Performing Arts

1904 births
1988 deaths
Barrymore family
English male film actors
English male stage actors
English male television actors
Male actors from Bradford
20th-century English male actors
20th-century English dramatists and playwrights
English male dramatists and playwrights
20th-century English male writers
People from Nelson, New Hampshire
British expatriate male actors in the United States